Hur or Howr may refer to:
 Hur, Ardabil, a village in Ardabil Province, Iran
 Hur, Qaleh Ganj, a village in Kerman Province, Iran
 Hur, Ravar, a village in Kerman Province, Iran
 Hur Rural District, in Kerman Province, Iran
 Hur-e Olya, a village in Kerman Province, Iran